Velimir Grgić (born 11 May 1978) is a Croatian retired footballer.

Honours
Regionalliga Nord (IV): 2009
Regionalliga West (IV): 2010

External links
 

1978 births
Living people
Sportspeople from Vinkovci
Association football forwards
Croatian footballers
HNK Cibalia players
TuS Koblenz players
Kickers Emden players
SV Sandhausen players
Holstein Kiel players
1. FC Saarbrücken players
Croatian Football League players
3. Liga players
Croatian expatriate footballers
Expatriate footballers in Germany
Croatian expatriate sportspeople in Germany